Lee Patrick (November 22, 1901 – November 21, 1982) was an American actress whose career began in 1922 on the New York stage with her role in The Bunch and Judy which headlined Adele Astaire and featured Adele's brother Fred Astaire.

Patrick continued to perform in dozens of roles on the stage for the next decade, frequently in musicals and comedies, but also in dramatic parts like her 1931 performance as Meg in Little Women. She began to branch out into films in 1929. She played numerous guest roles in American television, but became a staple for that medium during the two-year run of Topper. As Henrietta Topper, her comedic timing played well against Leo G. Carroll as her husband, and against that of the two ghosts played by Robert Sterling and Anne Jeffreys. Patrick lent her voice to various animated characters of The Alvin Show in the early 1960s.

Personal life 
Patrick was born on November 22, 1901, in New York City. By 1937, Patrick married newsman-writer Tom Wood, author of "The Lighter Side of Billy Wilder", and remained married 45 years, until her death. They had no children. During her career in Hollywood, she was not in good standing with gossip columnist Louella Parsons, and this conflict kept her career stuck in the "B" ranks. Wood wrote a frank piece on Parsons which did not go over well with the columnist. 

Patrick was a Republican and was supportive of Dwight Eisenhower's campaign during the 1952 presidential election. She was an Episcopalian.

Acting career

Stage 
Patrick debuted on Broadway in November 1922 in the ensemble of The Bunch and Judy, which ran for eight weeks. In September 1924 she returned to Broadway in an 8-week run of The Green Beetle at the Klaw Theatre, portraying the lead characters' daughter who escaped a murder attempt.

The Undercurrent was only the first of 5 plays in which Patrick honed her talent in 1925. The Backslapper (1925) was a political drama that ran for 33 performances with Patrick in a supporting role as Mrs. Kennedy. Patrick performed more comedy later in 1925: Bachelors' Brides was a farce in which she played a guardian angel; It All Depends was another comedy, The farce A Kiss in a Taxi completed Patrick's stage work of 1925.

The Shelf (1926) ran for 32 performances. Patrick acted in three plays in 1927: the 12-performance comedy Baby Mine; the equally brief The Matrimonial Bed; and Nightstick, an 84-performance run through January 1928. The 24-performance The Common Sin was the only other play she did in 1928.

June Moon gave Patrick her longest run of her stage career, 273 performances in 1929 and 1930, and 48 performances in 1933. She rounded out 1930 with the 13-performance run of Room of Dreams. Privilege Car was her first play of 1931, but she soon was on stage in the musical Friendship and finished out that year with 17 performances as Meg in Little Women One of the briefest plays of her career was The Girl Outside in 1932, which ran for 8 performances; however, that one came on the heels of Blessed Event that had run for 115 performances.

After Shooting Star in 1933, and Slightly Delirious, her only play of 1934, Patrick began to look towards a film career. Knock on Wood and Abide With Me did not fare much better for her. She had a long run of 169 performances in Stage Door in 1936–1937, but only did one more Broadway play after that, the comedy Michael Drops In.

Feature films 

Patrick had the starring role in her first film, Strange Cargo, an early American sound production for Pathé released on March 31, 1929. In this remake of producer Benjamin Glazer's Missing Man, British actor George Barraud played her leading man. It was another six years before she made another film: The Casino Murder Case for MGM. She had a bit part as a nurse in the film, which brought her together for the first time with Leo G. Carroll, with whom two decades later she worked on the television series Topper.

She remained in Hollywood and appeared in Border Cafe (1937). Over the next several years, she played numerous supporting roles, without attracting much critical attention. Patrick appeared in The Maltese Falcon (1941) as Effie Perine, the loyal and quick-thinking secretary of Humphrey Bogart's Sam Spade. Perine was one of Patrick's more enduring film characterizations. The same year, she appeared in a leading role as an intelligent, crime-solving nurse in The Nurse's Secret.
 
Her other films include The Sisters (1938), Footsteps in the Dark (1941), Now, Voyager (1942), Mrs. Parkington (1944), Gambler's Choice (1944), Mildred Pierce (1945), Wake Up and Dream (1946), Caged (1950), There's No Business Like Show Business (1954), Vertigo (1958), Auntie Mame (1958), Pillow Talk (1959), Summer and Smoke (1961), and 7 Faces of Dr. Lao (1964).

In the mid-1960s, Lee retired to travel and paint in Orange County, California, but was coaxed back one more time to Hollywood. Her final film role was a reprise of the character Effie Perine in The Black Bird, a spoof of the Maltese Falcon, starring George Segal as Sam Spade, Jr., who in the storyline was forced to continue his father's work and to keep his increasingly sarcastic secretary; the film attempted to turn its revered predecessor into a comedy. The only actor joining her from the original cast was Elisha Cook Jr. The film premiered May 9, 1976.

Television 

Patrick appeared on television in the sitcom Topper (1953–1955) with Leo G. Carroll, Anne Jeffreys, and Robert Sterling.

She made several appearances as the mother of Ida Lupino in the sitcom Mr. Adams and Eve (1957–1958). In 1962 she played Mrs. Carreway, who mistook Marshal Micah Torrance to be her long lost husband, in The Rifleman episode “Guilty Conscience.” In 1963, she appeared as Aunt Wilma Howard in the episode "Skeleton in the Closet" of the sitcom The Real McCoys.

In 1965, she appeared as Mrs. Ashton Durham in the episode "It's a Dog's World" of Hazel and as Cora Prichard in an episode titled "Noblesse Oblige" during the show's final season. She turned in a voice performance as Mrs. Frumpington in an episode of the animated series The Alvin Show, which may be heard on the soundtrack LP by David Seville and The Chipmunks. Patrick made three appearances on I Married Joan.

Death 
Patrick died suddenly on November 21, 1982, from a heart seizure at Laguna Beach, California, a day before her 81st birthday.

Acting credits

Stage

Film 
Key to studio abbreviations

Television

Citations

Notes

References

External links 

 
 
 
 

1901 births
1982 deaths
Actresses from New York City
American film actresses
American stage actresses
American television actresses
20th-century American actresses
California Republicans
New York (state) Republicans
20th-century American Episcopalians